Ptychochromis loisellei is a species of cichlid from the Mahanara River basin north of Sambava in northeastern Madagascar. It remains common within its small range, but it is threatened by habitat loss and introduced species. The similar named Paretroplus loisellei is also restricted to the Mahanara River basin. The specific name honours Paul V. Loiselle, Emeritus Curator of Freshwater Fishes at the New York Aquarium and a researcher in, and campaigner for the conservation of, the freshwater fish of Madagascar.

References

loisellei
Freshwater fish of Madagascar
Fish described in 2006
Taxonomy articles created by Polbot